Öpik is an Estonian surname. Notable people with the surname include:

Armin Öpik (1898–1983), Estonian/Australian paleontologist 
Ernst Öpik (1893–1985), Estonian astronomer
Öpik-Oort cloud, hypothesized spherical cloud of comets
2099 Öpik, asteroid, named after Ernst Öpik
Öpik, crater on Phobos, also named after Ernst Öpik
Ilmar Öpik (1917–2001), Estonian energetics scientist and academic
Lembit Öpik (born 1965), British politician

Estonian-language surnames